Professional sumo has had several controversies over its long history. These include proven allegations of match-fixing to hazing.

Match-fixing

Due to the hierarchical structure of the sport, where top ranked wrestlers have great advantages in salary and status over lower ranked wrestlers, speculation about the existence of match-fixing and isolated reports of match fixing have surfaced over the years. The Japan Sumo Association (JSA) repeatedly denied any wrestlers were involved in match-fixing, known as yaocho, and even took publishers to court over such allegations.

However, in 2011, it was announced that an investigation by police had discovered cell phone text messages indicating that a number of matches had been fixed. Allegedly, 14 wrestlers and a few stablemasters were involved. In the course of the investigation, several wrestlers eventually admitted to match-fixing for money. As a consequence, the board of directors of the
JSA decided in an extraordinary meeting to cancel the March 2011 tournament in Osaka, the first time this had happened since 1946. In all, fourteen wrestlers were judged guilty of match-fixing, to which most of them admitted involvement. All of the wrestlers judged to be involved were forced to retire.

The JSA's investigative panel stated in May 2011 that match-fixing appears to have been widespread. The panel stated that it would be difficult to discover, however, the full extent of the problem. The May 2011 tournament went ahead but with no sponsorship, live TV coverage or trophy presentations, and was referred to as the "Technical Examination Tournament".

One wrestler charged with match-fixing, Sōkokurai, strenuously denied any involvement and won a court case in early 2013 deeming his dismissal groundless. He was subsequently reinstated by the JSA, and appeared in the July 2013 tournament in the top division.

Gambling and yakuza ties
On July 4, 2010, the Japan Sumo Association announced its decision to dismiss the ōzeki Kotomitsuki and the stablemaster Ōtake, former Takatōriki, for betting on baseball games in a gambling ring run by the yakuza. At the same time, two stable masters were demoted and an unprecedented 18 wrestlers banned from the July 2010 tournament. Sumo Association chairman Hanaregoma declared in August 2010 that "violent groups or antisocial forces" were being banned from accessing tournament venues, training stables and other facilities.

Three months before Hanaregoma's announcement, Japan's largest yakuza group, Yamaguchi-gumi, bought fifty prized seats during a tournament so that gangsters were prominently visible during the national broadcast of the match. According to experts, this was an endeavor to cheer up an incarcerated boss. Although there have always been alleged ties between sumo and the yakuza, the sport has suffered from waning public interest and sponsorship during the economic recession, which may have contributed to closer ties to the underworld for financial support.

During the investigation into an illegal establishment in Sōka, Saitama Prefecture that was raided in September 2021, suspicions were raised by the Saitama Prefectural Police about the involvement of both Hidenoumi and Shiden, as well as other sumo wrestlers that may have possibly participated. During the January 2022 basho Japanese media reported that the Sumo Association's compliance committee, after holding hearings, concluded that Hidenoumi and Shiden participated in illegal gambling. The association's board of directors is expected to take up the issue at their meeting on 27 January 2022.

Hazing

It has been well-known and accepted for many years that sumo stables engage in the systematic hazing and physical punishment of young disciples in order to "toughen them up". Stable masters have often been proud to show to the media how they frequently use a shinai to beat those who fall out of line, and elder wrestlers are often put in charge of bullying younger ones to keep them in line, for instance, by making them hold heavy objects for long periods of time.
However, this system of hazing was widely criticized in late 2007 when a hazing scandal came to light, in which a 17-year-old sumo trainee named Takashi Saito from the Tokitsukaze stable died after a serious bullying incident involving his stablemaster Jun'ichi Yamamoto hitting him on the head with a large beer bottle and fellow rikishi being subsequently ordered to physically abuse him further. The stablemaster and three other wrestlers who were involved were arrested in February 2008, after which Japanese Prime Minister Yasuo Fukuda demanded the JSA take steps to ensure such an incident never happens again. In May 2009, Yamamoto was sentenced to six years in jail.

Health effects
The sumo lifestyle has negative health effects which become apparent later in life. Sumo wrestlers have a life expectancy between 60 and 65, more than 20 years shorter than the average Japanese male, as the diet and sport take a toll on the wrestler's body. Many develop type 2 diabetes or high blood pressure, and they are prone to heart attacks due to the enormous amount of body mass and fat that they accumulate. The excessive intake of alcohol can lead to liver problems and the stress on their joints due to their excess weight can cause arthritis. Recently, the standards of weight gain are becoming less strict, in an effort to improve the overall health of the wrestlers.

Women and sumo

Professional sumo excludes women from competition and ceremonies. Women are not allowed to enter or touch the sumo wrestling ring (dohyō), a tradition stemming from Shinto and Buddhist beliefs that women are "impure" because of menstrual blood.

The female Governor of Osaka from 2000–2008, Fusae Ohta, when called upon to present the Governor's Prize to the champion of the annual Osaka tournament, was required to do so on the walkway beside the ring or send a male representative in her place. She repeatedly challenged the JSA's policy by requesting to be allowed to fulfill her traditional role as Governor. Her requests were repeatedly rejected until the end of her five-year term.

In April 2018, during a non-tournament sumo event in Kyoto Prefecture, two women rushed to the aid of the mayor of Maizuru when he collapsed in the middle of the dohyō. While the women were attempting to provide emergency treatment, a referee repeatedly asked them to leave the ring. The chairman of the Sumo Association later apologized for what he called an inappropriate response, saying that he greatly appreciated the women's efforts.

The view of those who criticize this continuing "men-only" policy is that it is discriminatory and oppressive.
In general, women in the sumo world are only expected to be supportive wives of the wrestlers, and, in the case that their husband has become a stablemaster, a surrogate mother for all of his trainee wrestlers.
The view of the JSA is that this is a tradition that has been firmly maintained through the centuries, so it would be a dishonor to all of their ancestors to change it.

This was not always the case. In the cities it was more of a spectacle often associated with brothels. However, in some areas of Japan female sumo had a serious role in certain Shinto rituals. In later years, there were limited tours of female sumo that lasted for a time. However, female sumo is not considered to be authentic by most Japanese and is now prohibited from taking place beyond amateur settings.

See also
Sumo
2011 in sumo

References

Sumo
Sumo